Learning through Landscapes (LtL) is a UK charity which promotes children's outdoor learning and play through improved use of school playgrounds. Started in 1990 as the output of a research project, the charity soon grew in response to the demand from schools and funders.

LtL was a founding partner of  the Scottish 'Grounds for Learning Project' funded by Scottish Natural Heritage. Scottish Natural Heritage has remained a main partner of LtL in Scotland for 25 years. Grounds for Learning was re-named 'LtL Scotland' in 2019 and maintains an office in Stirling.

Learning through Landscapes has been involved with a number of projects including: Local School Nature Grants (in partnership with Peoples Postcode Lottery), Outdoor Classroom Day (UK & Ireland), Living through Landscapes (dementia friendly gardens), Woodland Play,  The Scottish Natural Play project, Fruitfull Schools, Fruitful Communities, Polli:Nation., My School My Planet and Forest Kindergarten

LtL offers many free outdoor lesson ideas, outdoor learning training and advice. 
LtL operates from two offices, one in Winchester and one in Stirling.

The charity has been involved in many publications on behalf of local and national government, notably in School Grounds Design for DfEE and The Good School Playground Guide for the Scottish Government.

LtL was one of the founder members of the International School Grounds Alliance having hosted the first International School Grounds conference in Hampshire in 2010.

Its patrons are: 
Sir David Attenborough, who in 2014 created their Basic Need film, this refers to the basic shortage of school places currently being experienced by schools.

Jonathon Porritt and Lord Remnant CVO FCA

References

External links
 Official website
 International School Grounds Alliance

Charities based in Hampshire
Children's charities based in the United Kingdom